Gymnothorax mccoskeri is a moray eel found in the western Pacific and the eastern Indian ocean. It was first named by Smith and Böhlke in 1997, and is commonly known as the McCosker's moray, many-banded moray-eel, or the manyband moray.

References

mccoskeri
Fish described in 1997